Marco Pinotti (born 25 February 1976 in Osio Sotto, Lombardy) is an Italian former road racing cyclist, who competed as a professional between 1999 and 2013. An individual time trial specialist, Pinotti was a six-time Italian Time Trial Champion (2005, 2007, 2008, 2009, 2010 and 2013).

Career
As an amateur he won 28 races before turning professional in 1999 with the  team.  He won the Grand Prix d'Europa in 1999 together with his teammate Raivis Belohvoščiks and the 5th stage of the 2000 Tour de Pologne.

In 2001 he finished second in stage 15 of the Tour de France behind Belgian Rik Verbrugghe.  He had surgery on his ulna in November 2001 and started training again only in February 2002.  He returned to competition in April 2002.

The 2003 season brought some victories as he won the 4th stage in the Tour of the Basque Country and the King of the Mountains classification. In the Bici Vasca he crashed and broke his pelvis, forcing recuperation.  He has since fully recovered.  His speciality is in individual time trials.

Pinotti joined the then newly formed Spanish team  team in 2005. He won the Italian National Time Trial Championship in 2005. Pinotti came second to Luca Ascani in the 2007 Italian National time trials but Ascani was found to have tested positive for EPO and Pinotti was awarded the jersey. Pinotti retained the title in 2008.

At the 2007 Giro d'Italia, Pinotti placed second in stage six to Spoleto and took over the leader's pink jersey. He held it for four stages. In 2008, he won the final stage time trial, and again in 2012. In 2009 and 2011, he help his teams win the team time trial. The result in 2011 helped him take over the pink jersey for one day.

In 2008, Pinotti joined team Highroad, which became Columbia HighRoad in 2009 and HTC-Columbia in 2010.

At the end of the year, he released a book, Il Mestiere Del Ciclista Una Vita In Bicicletta (The Cycling Professor).

Career achievements

Major results

1999
 7th Firenze–Pistoia
2000
 1st Stage 5 Tour de Pologne
 2nd Duo Normand (with László Bodrogi)
 4th Giro di Toscana
 7th Grand Prix des Nations
 9th Overall Ronde van Nederland
 10th Time trial, UCI Road World Championships
2001
 9th Gran Premio Città di Camaiore
2002
 6th Firenze–Pistoia
2003
 Tour of the Basque Country
1st  Mountains classification
1st Stage 4 
 9th Overall Tour de Luxembourg
 10th Overall Peace Race
2004
 3rd Time trial, National Road Championships
 6th Grand Prix Eddy Merckx
 8th Giro della Romagna
 10th Overall Ronde van Nederland
 10th Chrono des Herbiers
2005
 1st  Time trial, National Road Championships
 4th Firenze–Pistoia
 7th Overall Tour de Georgia
 8th Chrono des Herbiers
2006
 2nd Time trial, National Road Championships
 8th Overall Tour de Georgia
2007
 1st  Time trial, National Road Championships
 4th Grand Prix Pino Cerami
 Giro d'Italia
Held  after Stages 6–9
2008
 1st  Time trial, National Road Championships
 1st  Overall Tour of Ireland
 1st Stage 21 (ITT) Giro d'Italia
 2nd Firenze–Pistoia
 2nd GP Triberg-Schwarzwald
 3rd Overall Tour de Romandie
 4th Chrono des Nations
 9th Overall Danmark Rundt
2009
 1st  Time trial, National Road Championships
 1st Stage 5 Tour of the Basque Country
 1st Stage 1 (TTT) Giro d'Italia
 1st Stage 3 (TTT) Tour de Romandie
 3rd Overall Tour of Missouri
 5th Time trial, UCI Road World Championships
 5th Overall Tour of Ireland
 6th Overall Sachsen Tour
 9th Clásica de San Sebastián
2010
 1st  Time trial, National Road Championships
 4th Overall Tour of Oman
 7th Overall Tour de Romandie
1st Prologue
 5th Overall Tour of the Basque Country
 9th Overall Giro d'Italia
2011
 Giro d'Italia 
1st Stage 1 (TTT)
Held  after Stage 1 
 4th Overall Tour de Romandie
 6th Overall Tirreno–Adriatico
2012
 1st Stage 21 (ITT) Giro d'Italia
 1st  Sprints classification, Tour of the Basque Country
 2nd  Team time trial, UCI Road World Championships
 3rd Time trial, National Road Championships
 5th Time trial, Olympic Games
 6th Overall Tour of Austria
1st Stage 7 (ITT)
 9th Overall Giro del Trentino
1st Stage 1 (TTT) 
2013
 1st  Time trial, National Road Championships
 4th Chrono des Nations
 7th Time trial, UCI Road World Championships

Grand Tour general classification results timeline

Notes and references

External links

 Fan website
 

Italian male cyclists
Cyclists from the Province of Bergamo
Italian Giro d'Italia stage winners
1976 births
Living people
Cyclists at the 2012 Summer Olympics
Olympic cyclists of Italy